Fissel's School is a historic one-room school building located at Shrewsbury Township, York County, Pennsylvania.  It was built in 1896, and is a 1 1/2-story, brick building with Queen Anne stylistic elements.  It measures 28 feet, 6 inches, wide and 30 feet, 4 inches, deep with a 22 foot wide, 7 foot deep entrance portico.  It has a gable roof with decorative bargeboard and fishscale shingles.  Atop the roof above the entrance is a belfry.  It ceased use as a school about 1946.

It was added to the National Register of Historic Places in 1997.

References

One-room schoolhouses in Pennsylvania
School buildings on the National Register of Historic Places in Pennsylvania
Queen Anne architecture in Pennsylvania
School buildings completed in 1896
Buildings and structures in York County, Pennsylvania
National Register of Historic Places in York County, Pennsylvania